De principis instructione (Instruction for a Ruler) is a Latin work by Gerald of Wales. It is divided into three "Distinctions". The first contains moral precepts and reflections; the second and third deal with the history of the later 12th century, with a focus on the character and acts of king Henry II of England and especially his disputes with the kings of France, Louis VII and Philip II and with his own four sons, Henry the Young King, Geoffrey, Duke of Brittany, Richard, count of Poitou and John Lackland.

Gerald was learned in classical, Biblical and medieval Latin literature and in this work cites the Bible, Servius (the commentator on Virgil), Gildas, the Itinerarium Regis Ricardi and many other works.

Contents

First distinction. Topics include Britain as a land fertile in tyrants; the Picts and Scots; old English laws about shipwrecks; the recent discovery of King Arthur's tomb in the isle of Avalon; King Edward the Confessor; the virtues of King Louis VII of France
The monarch's moderation
The monarch's gentleness
The monarch's shyness
The monarch's chastity
The monarch's patience
The monarch's temperance
The monarch's clemency
The monarch's munificence
The monarch's magnificence
The monarch's justice: especially on the admirable punishment of crimes in France, where a first offence is punished with public whipping, if once repeated with mutilation or branding, if twice repeated with blinding or hanging
The monarch's prudence
The monarch's foresight
The monarch's modesty
The monarch's boldness and bravery
The monarch's glory and nobility
The difference between a king and a tyrant
Bloody deaths of tyrants
Praiseworthy lives and deaths of good monarchs
On the names of monarchs
The monarch's religion and devotion: especially on the remarkable chastity of kings Louis VII and Louis VIII of France
The monarch's good conduct and fitting end
Second distinction
The earlier years of king Henry II of England's reign and the vast increase in his territories
Principal visitors to England during his reign
His later crimes and the martyrdom of Thomas Becket
The wheel of Henry II's fortune and his continual disputes with his sons
Letter showing that Louis VII and Henry II agreed to go on pilgrimage to Jerusalem together
The two Cardinals who came to Normandy to enquire into the death of Thomas Becket
The three monasteries promised in compensation for the failed pilgrimage, and how the promise was evaded
God's punishment on Henry II and the death of Henry the Young King
The titles of "Henry III" (the Young King)
Geoffrey, Duke of Brittany's second estrangement from his father, and his sudden death
The titles of Geoffrey and of John Lackland
God's warnings to Henry II and how they were ignored
The revelation of Robert of Estreby
How God urged Henry II to change his ways, with warnings and punishments but also with kindnesses
Letter detailing the agreement between Henry II and Philip II of France
Letter showing that Henry II arranged peace between Philip II and Philip, Count of Flanders
Letter showing that Henry II's testament was made at Waltham
Privileges requested from Pope Alexander III, mainly concerning Wales
Privileges concerning Ireland
The Council of Cashel
Titles of Henry II (copied from Gerald's work Topography of Ireland)
Saladin's attack on the Kingdom of Jerusalem
Pope Urban III's letter to England on this subject
Patriarch Heraclius of Jerusalem's visit to England to ask king Henry II's help
Pope Lucius III's letter of advice and warning to Henry II
Gerald's own conversation with Henry II on this subject
Henry II's reply, given at London, and the Patriarch's complete failure
The Patriarch's prophetic warnings to Henry II
A description and characterization of Henry II
Notable contemporary events in England
If the end is favourable the history is praiseworthy
Third distinction
The last meeting between Louis VII and Henry II, and Louis's prayer
First territorial arrangements of Philip II of France
Jerusalem meanwhile almost wholly conquered by the Muslims
Pope Clement III's letter demanding the aid of the faithful
Richard, Duke of Poitou takes the Cross, first among leaders north of the Alps, and sets a noble example
On astrology
Duke Richard sets out in spite of his father's obstruction
Titles of Duke Richard
Henry II's tithe intended to finance the Third Crusade
Duke Richard estranged from his father and allied with Philip II of France
Henry II's confusion and anger
Why is Normandy less well defended than in the past? Question and answer
King Henry II's groin trouble and his late and forced confession
The dream of Richard de Riduariis and its fulfilment
Frederick Barbarossa takes the Cross
Gerald's dream about the Crusade
The Emperor's bravery and his challenge to Saladin
Saladin's reply
The Emperor's journey through Hungary, crossing of the Danube, and journey through Bulgaria to Macedonia
The messengers sent to Isaac II Angelos at first arrested, then released
The deceptions of Kilij Arslan II of the Sultanate of Rûm
The Emperor drowned in Lesser Armenia; the army reaches Antioch
Frederick VI, Duke of Swabia leads them from Antioch to Tyre and Acre
Henry II is driven from the burning city of Le Mans
The French capture Tours and besiege Henry II at Azay-le-Rideau
The death of Henry II
The unfavourable family background of Henry II and Queen Eleanor of Aquitaine and of their children
Events presaging Henry II's death
Dreams presaging his death
The dream of William II of England and the resemblance of his death to that of Richard I
Some afterthoughts

Bibliography

Giraldus Cambrensis De instructione principum libri iii. London: Anglia Christiana, 1846. [Book 1 omitted]
Recueil des historiens des Gaules et de la France vol. 18 ed. M.-J.-J. Brial. New ed. Paris: Palmé, 1879. [Chapters irrelevant to French history omitted]
Giraldus Cambrensis ed. Brewer (Rolls Series). London

External links
The original Latin chapter headings of De instructione principis (from the Latin Vicipaedia)
London, British Library, Cotton MS Julius B XIII, ff 48–173: sole surviving manuscript of the work

12th-century Latin books
13th-century Latin books
12th-century history books
13th-century history books
Medieval Welsh literature
History books about the United Kingdom
Works by Gerald of Wales